Shand-e Maleki (also Romanized as Shand-e Maleḵī) is a village in Bandan Rural District, in the Central District of Nehbandan County, South Khorasan Province, Iran. At the 2006 census, its population was 33, in 7 families.

References 

Populated places in Nehbandan County